Governor Evans may refer to:

Daniel J. Evans (born 1925), 16th Governor of Washington
John Gary Evans (1863–1942), 85th Governor of South Carolina
John Evans (Pennsylvania governor) (1678–?), Colonial Governor of Pennsylvania from 1704 to 1709
John Evans (Idaho governor) (1925–2014), 27th Governor of Idaho
John Evans (Colorado governor) (1814–1897), 2nd Governor of the Territory of Colorado
Melvin H. Evans (1917–1984), Governor of the United States Virgin Islands
Waldo A. Evans (1869–1936), military Governor of the United States Virgin Islands and American Samoa